Nassarius kooli is a species of sea snail, a marine gastropod mollusk in the family Nassariidae, the Nassa mud snails or dog whelks.

Description

Distribution
Nassarius kooli is native to the western pacific, with many specimens having been found in the East China Sea and the Philippines.

References

Nassariidae
Gastropods described in 2009